Capitulations of the Ottoman Empire were contracts between the Ottoman Empire and other powers in Europe, particularly France. Turkish capitulations, or Ahidnâmes were generally bilateral acts whereby definite arrangements were entered into by each contracting party towards the other, not mere concessions.

The Turkish Capitulations were grants made by successive Sultans to Christian nations, conferring rights and privileges in favour of their subjects resident or trading in the Ottoman dominions, following the policy towards European states of the Byzantine Empire.

According to these capitulations traders entering the Ottoman Empire were exempt from local prosecution, local taxation, local conscription, and the searching of their domicile.

The capitulations were initially made during the Ottoman Empire's military dominance, to entice and encourage commercial exchange with Western merchants. However, after military dominance shifted to Europe, significant economic and political advantages were granted to the European powers by the Ottoman Empire.

History
In the first instance capitulations were granted separately to each Christian state, beginning with the Genoese in 1453, which entered into peaceful relations with the Ottoman Empire. Afterwards new capitulations were obtained which summed up in one document earlier concessions, and added to them in general terms whatever had been conceded to one or more other states; a stipulation which became a most favored nation article.

Around 1535 a capitulation was made by Suleiman the Magnificent regarding France.

France signed its first treaty of Capitulations with the Mamluk Sultanate in Cairo in 1500, during the rule of Louis XII. After the Turks conquered Egypt in the Ottoman–Mamluk War (1516–1517), the Ottomans upheld the capitulations to the French and applied them to the entire empire.

The Ottoman-French Treaty of 1740 marked the apogee of French influence in the Ottoman Empire in the eighteenth century. In the following years the French had an unchallenged position in Levant trade and in transportation between Ottoman ports. Near contemporary Ottoman capitulations to European powers such as Britain and Holland (1737), the Kingdom of Naples (1740), Denmark (1756), and Prussia (1761) were to offset and balance the capitulations granted to France in 1740.

Status
The latter did, and the former did not, signify a reciprocal engagement.
 
According to Capitulations, and treaties confirmatory of them, made between the Porte and other states, foreigners resident in Turkey were subject to the laws of their respective countries.

Thus, although the Turkish capitulations were not in themselves treaties, yet by subsequent confirmation they acquired the force of commercial durable instead of personal nature; the conversion of permissive into perfect rights; questions as to contraband and neutral trade stated in definite terms.

Abolition
In 1914, the Committee of Union and Progress abolished the capitulations in the Ottoman Empire and introduced economic policies that would benefit the Ottoman economy.

As far as Turkey is concerned, the capitulations were abolished by the Treaty of Lausanne (1923), specifically by Article 28:

Capitulations in Egypt ended in 1949 as stipulated in the Montreux Convention Regarding the Abolition of the Capitulations in Egypt in 1937.<ref>Convention regarding the Abolition of the Capitulations in Egypt, Protocol, and Declaration by the Royal Egyptian Government (Montreux, 8 May 1936) Art 1.</ref>

List of capitulations
Capitulatory treaties were signed with the following states:Philip Marshall Brown, Foreigners in Turkey: Their Juridical Status (Princeton University Press, 1914), p. 41.
Venice (1454)
France (1535, 1673, 1740)
England (1579, 1675)
 United Kingdom (1809)
Netherlands (1612, 1634, 1680)
Austria (1615?)
Russia (1711, 1783)
Sweden (1737)
Sardinia (1740, 1825)
Denmark (1746 or 1756)
Prussia (1761)
Spain (1782)
United States (1830)
Belgium (1838)
Hanseatic League (1839)
Portugal (1843)
Greece (1854 or 1855)
Brazil (1858)
Bavaria (1870)

See also
 Economic history of the Ottoman Empire
 Foreign relations of the Ottoman Empire
 French post offices in the Ottoman Empire
 Chester concession
 Ottoman Public Debt
 Ottoman Public Debt Administration
 Mixed Courts of Egypt
 Ahidnâme
Protégé system

References

Bibliography
 Ahmad, F. "Ottoman perceptions of the capitulations 1800-1914," Journal of Islamic Studies, 11,1 (2000), 1-20.
 

 
 
 Longva, Anh Nga. "From the Dhimma to the Capitulations: Memory and Experience of Protection in Lebanon." in Religious Minorities in the Middle East: Domination, Self-Empowerment, Accommodation (2012): 47-70. online
 Olson, Robert. "The Ottoman-French Treaty of 1740" Turkish Studies Association Bulletin (1991) 15#2 pp. 347-355 online 
 Vlami, Despina. Trading with the Ottomans: The Levant Company in the Middle East'' (Bloomsbury, 2014).

Politics of the Ottoman Empire

Economic history of France
Catholicism and Islam
Foreign relations of the Ottoman Empire
France–Ottoman Empire relations
Germany–Ottoman Empire relations
Greece–Ottoman Empire relations
Ottoman Empire–United Kingdom relations
Nationality treaties
Christianity in the Ottoman Empire